Mechatronics Polytechnic of Sanata Dharma (PMSD) grew out of the Jesuit Sanata Dharma University in Yogyakarta, Indonesia, and became a separate institution in 2011.

Courses
Mechatronics Polytechnic of Sanata Dharma offers diploma courses in Mechatronics, Medical Instrumentation, and Mechatronics Product Design. Practice is emphasized over theory, with two-thirds of class time spent in actual practice. The aim is to furnish job-ready graduates in both automated and medical applications, in line with increased industrial automation and health needs in Indonesia.

PMSD is a member of the Indonesian section of the Institute of Electrical and Electronics Engineers (OEEE).

See also
 List of Jesuit sites

References  

U
Universities in the Special Region of Yogyakarta
Sleman Regency
Jesuit universities and colleges